John William Goodwin (29 September 1920 – 7 May 1995) was an English professional footballer who scored 30 goals from 163 appearances in the Football League playing for Birmingham City and Brentford. He played as an outside right.

Playing career
Goodwin was born in Worcester. When he was demobbed after the Second World War, Goodwin joined Birmingham City from Southern League club Worcester City. Described as a "sturdily-built ... bustler", he made his debut in the Second Division on 18 September 1946, deputising for Neil Dougall at inside right in an away game against West Bromwich Albion which Birmingham lost 3–0. He played only intermittently while Jock Mulraney remained first choice on the wing, but by the middle of the 1947–48 season had accumulated 31 league games and made his contribution to the club's Second Division title. He lost his place on the arrival of Jackie Stewart, playing only once in the First Division, and in April 1949 Goodwin together with teammate Wally Quinton joined Brentford. In five seasons with Brentford Goodwin played 131 matches in the Second Division and scored 22 goals. At the end of the 1947–48 season he moved into non-league football with Dartford.

Later career
In 1957 Goodwin joined the coaching staff at Brentford, remaining there for six years. In the late 1960s and early 1970s, he coached the Old Harrovian football club, and also coached in the United States. In 1965 he served as the manager for Toronto Inter-Roma in the Eastern Canada Professional Soccer League. Outside football, he worked for a gas company.

Goodwin died in Worcester in 1995, at the age of 74, after collapsing during a VE Day parade.

References

External links
Goodwin's league stats at Neil Brown's site

1920 births
1995 deaths
Sportspeople from Worcester, England
English footballers
Association football wingers
Worcester City F.C. players
Birmingham City F.C. players
Brentford F.C. players
Dartford F.C. players
English Football League players
Brentford F.C. non-playing staff